William Widdrington, 1st Baron Widdrington (11 July 16103 September 1651) was an English landowner and politician who sat in the House of Commons from 1640 to 1642 and was created a peer in 1643. He fought in the Royalist army in the English Civil War and was killed in battle in 1651.

Biography
Widdrington was born on 11 July 1610, the son and heir of Sir Henry Widdrington of Widdrington, Northumberland and his wife Mary Curwen, daughter of Sir Nicholas Curwen. 

Knighted in 1632, he was appointed High Sheriff of Northumberland in 1636. He was then elected Member of Parliament for Northumberland in both the Short and the Long Parliaments of 1640 to 1642, but in August 1642 he was expelled for taking up arms in support of Charles I.

During the Civil War he fought for the King chiefly in Yorkshire and Lincolnshire and on 9 July 1642 was rewarded for his loyalty to the Crown by creation as 1st Baronet Widdrington of Widdrington. He served as governor of Lincoln in 1643, and on 2 November 1643 was elevated to the Peerage as 1st Baron Widdrington of Blankney.

In 1644, after helping to defend York, and the Kings defeat at Marston Moor he left England with the Duke of Newcastle for exile in Hamburg.

In 1648, he was condemned to death in his absence by the House of Commons and his estates were confiscated. He returned in 1650 when he accompanied Charles II to Scotland and in 1651 he was mortally wounded while fighting for him at Wigan.

Family
In 1629 Widdrington married Mary, daughter and heiress of Anthony Thorold of Blankney Hall, Blankney, near Lincoln.  They had eight sons and two daughters including:
William Widdrington, 2nd Baron Widdrington (died 1675) first son; had issue.
Edward, who married Elizabeth, daughter and heiress of Sir Thomas Horseley, of Long Horseley, Northumberland. They had at least one daughter Teresa who married William, Wheler, 3rd Baronet.
 Jane, married Sir Charles Stanley, K.B., nephew of the Lord Derby.
 Ralph Widdrington (MP), c. 1640-1715

Arms

References

Sources

Further reading

1610 births
1651 deaths
Barons Widdrington
People from Widdrington, Northumberland
High Sheriffs of Northumberland
Cavaliers
English MPs 1640 (April)
English MPs 1640–1648
People killed in the English Civil War